Chandra Chakori  is a 2003 Indian Kannada language romance drama film directed and written by S. Narayan. The film stars Murali, Priya and Naaz, all making their debuts, along with Srinagara Kitty in a negative role.

Cast 

 Murali as Puttaraju 
 Priya as Sudha 
 Naaz as Sevanthi 
 Srinagar Kitty as Mahesh 
 Shari 
 Ashok
 Doddanna as Gajendrappa 
 Shobaraj as Boregowda 
 Sundar Raj as Subbayya 
 Sathyapriya
 Honnavalli Krishna as Naganna 
 Tension Nagaraj
 Renuka Prasad 
 Kavitha
 Sadhana
 Bhanu Prakash
 Sridhar Raj

Production 
The film was initially planned to be simultaneously shot in Telugu. The film was produced by Kumaraswamy, Narayan's friend who previously produced Surya Vamsha (1999) and Galate Aliyandru (2000).

Soundtrack 
The music was composed by S. A. Rajkumar and the lyrics were written by S. Narayan.

Release 
The release of the film was delayed due to an issue between producers and distributors.

Box office 
The film ran for twenty-five weeks in several theatres, thereby becoming a silver jubilee film. The success of this film and other films such as Raktha Kanneeru caused a lack of theatre screens for newer releases. This film ran for a year in Prakash Theater in Belgaum. Priya Pereira Chhabria, who made her debut with this film, later took a break from acting and opted for a career in dance.

Awards
 2003–04 Karnataka State Film Awards
 Best Third Best Film - H. D. Kumaraswamy and Anitha Kumaraswamy
 Best Cinematographer - P. K. H. Das
 Best Art Direction - G. Murthy

References 

2003 films
2000s Kannada-language films
Indian romantic drama films
2003 romantic drama films
Films directed by S. Narayan
Kannada films remade in other languages